The World Boxing Union (WBU) was a boxing sanctioning body. The original WBU was founded in January 1995 by IBF European representative, boxing journalist, actor and former holder of the title of Britain's heaviest man   Jon W. Robinson. It sanctioned boxing with various promoters worldwide. 
Following Robinson's death in 2004, the organization became dormant and was eventually dissolved.

An organization serving the same purpose and with the same name, but with no connections to the original, was formed in Germany in 2010 under the leadership of Torsten Knille.

List of WBU heavyweight champions

Other WBU champions (selected)

Other past WBU champions include Sirimongkol Singwancha, Sornpichai Kratingdaenggym, Pongsaklek Wonjongkam, Ricky Hatton, Eamonn Magee, Tony Oakey, Corrie Sanders, Enzo Maccarinelli, Lee McAllister, Angel Manfredy, George Scott, Hasim Rahman, Willie Limond, Craig Docherty, Michael Gomez, Kevin Lear, Anthony Farnell, Jimmy Lange, Derry Mathews, Choi Tseveenpurev, Jeremy Williams, Cristian Charquero, Wayne Elcock, Roy Jones Jr., David Burke, Vinny Pazienza, and Micky Ward.

In addition, Carlos Contreras defeated challenger Victor Rabanales by 8 RTKO.

List of WBU world champions

References

International sports organizations
Sports organizations established in 1995
Professional boxing organizations
International organisations based in Germany
World Boxing Council